Rampur is a village development committee in Ramechhap District in the Janakpur Zone of north-eastern Nepal. At the time of the 2001 Nepal census it had a population of 4,400 people living in 724 individual households.

References

External links
UN map of the municipalities of Ramechhap District

Populated places in Ramechhap District